Jean-Louis Mandengue (born September 15, 1971, in Paris) is a retired male boxer from France. At the 1996 Summer Olympics in Atlanta, Georgia, he fought in the men's light-heavyweight division (– 81 kg) and lost to Brazil's Daniel Bispo in the second round of the tournament.

External links
sports-reference

1971 births
Living people
Light-heavyweight boxers
Boxers at the 1996 Summer Olympics
Olympic boxers of France
Boxers from Paris
French male boxers